The 1990 Torneo Internazionale was a women's tennis tournament played on outdoor clay courts at the Country Time Club in Palermo, Italy that was part of the Tier V category of the 1990 WTA Tour. It was the third edition of the tournament and was held from 9 July until 13 July 1990. Second-seeded Isabel Cueto won the singles title.

Finals

Singles

 Isabel Cueto defeated  Barbara Paulus 6–2, 6–3
 It was Cueto's 1st singles title of the year and the 5th and last of her career.

Doubles

 Laura Garrone /  Karin Kschwendt defeated  Florencia Labat /  Barbara Romanò 6–2, 6–4

References

External links
 ITF tournament edition details
 Tournament draws

Internazionali Femminili di Palermo
Internazionali Femminili di Palermo
1990 in Italian women's sport
Torneo